The Knölker complex is an organoiron compound, which is a catalyst for transfer hydrogenation. The complex features an hydroxycyclopentadienyl ligand bound to an Fe(CO)2H centre.  It is generated by the corresponding cyclopentadienone tricarbonyl by treatment with base followed by acidification. The compound is related to the organoruthenium compound called Shvo's complex, a hydroxycyclopentadienyl derivative that also functions as a catalyst for hydrogenation.

References

Organoiron compounds
Carbonyl complexes
Hydrogenation catalysts
Trimethylsilyl compounds
Metal hydrides
Cyclopentadienyl complexes
Half sandwich compounds
Iron(II) compounds